Młyńsko may refer to the following places in Poland:
Młyńsko, Lower Silesian Voivodeship (south-west Poland)
Młyńsko, Pomeranian Voivodeship (north Poland)